The House of Laval is a family of barons, later counts, coming from the town of Laval, located in Northwestern France, part of the province of Maine before the French Revolution. The Laval were one of the most powerful families of Maine during the Middle Ages and also had a presence in Brittany, where their prestige was similar to the one of the Rohan. The House of Laval played a significant role in Breton history and during the Hundred Years War and the French Wars of Religion. They also favored the French Renaissance in Northwestern France, building several châteaux. The last male heir died during the 17th century, and his possessions went to the House of La Trémoille.

François de Laval was the first Roman Catholic bishop of Quebec; the city of Laval, Quebec, and the Université Laval were named after him.

Branches and titles
The House of Laval appeared during the first quarter of the 11th century. Its origins are unclear and the first mentioned baron is Guy I. The direct branch became extinct in the male line in 1211, after the death of Guy VI. His sister, Edme, had previously married Matthieu II de Montmorency with a contract stipulating that her first son should take the Laval surname and arms.

The branch of Montmorency-Laval died out in 1412 with Guy XII. His heiress, Anne, had married Jean de Montfort with a contract similar to Edme's one. Hence, her heirs took the name of Laval.

The branch of Montfort-Laval started with Jean de Montfort, nicknamed Guy XIII of Laval, who died in 1415, and ended with Guy XVII in 1547.

The branch of Rieux-Laval started with Louis de Sainte-Maure, who married the granddaughter of Guy XVI of Laval. This branch ended with Guy XX, killed in Hungary in 1605.

The possessions of Laval passed to the La Trémoille family, who stopped the medieval tradition according which all the counts of Laval had to be called "Guy".

Line of Descent

Barons of Laval
 Guy V de Laval (d 1210) married Avoise de Craon and sired
 Guy VI (d 1211) who died childless
 Emma (c1200-1264, sister of Guy VI) married Mathieu II de Montmorency and gave birth to
 Guy VII (d 1267) who married Philippa de Vitre and sired
 Guy VIII (d 1295), who married Isabelle Beaumont and sired
 Guy IX (d 1333), who married Beatrix de Gavre and sired
 Guy X (d 1347), who married Beatrix of Brittany (daughter of Arthur II) and sired
 Guy XI (d 1348) and
 Guy XII (d 1412), who married Jeanne de Laval (a second cousin, descended from Guy VIII).  His son Guy predeceased him in 1403.  The title then passed to
 Anne (d 1466, daughter of Guy XII), who married Jean de Montfort, making him Guy XIII de Laval.  They had several sons, including Guy XIV de Laval

Counts of Laval

 Guy XIV de Laval (d 1486), who married Isabella of Brittany and sired
 Guy XV (d 1501)
 Jean de Laval (brother of Guy XV) sired
 Guy XVI (d 1531), who married Charlotte of Naples and Anne de Montmorency.  By Anne, he sired
 Guy XVII (d 1547)
 Catherine (daughter of Guy XVI and Charlotte) had 2 daughters:
 Renee (d 1567), who reigned as Guyonne de Laval (counting as the 18th) and
 Claude (d 1561), who gave birth to
 Guy XIX (d 1586), who married Anne d'Alegre and sired
 Guy XX de Laval (d 1605), who was the last of his line, and the last Count to take the name of Guy.

Other notable members
Gilles de Montmorency-Laval (1404–1440), better known as Gilles de Rais, companion-in-arms of Joan of Arc and inspiration for the "Bluebeard" by Charles Perrault
André de Laval-Montmorency (c. 1408 – 1485), Marshal of France
Louis de Laval (d. 1489), governor of Dauphiné, Champagne, Touraine and Genoa
Jeanne de Laval, Queen consort of Naples and Sicily
Jean de Laval, count of Châteaubriant and Governor of Brittany, who was married to Françoise de Foix
Anne de Laval (1505–1554), who was a pretender to the throne of Naples and ancestor to kings of France and Belgium
Henri II de Montmorency (1595–1632), military commander
Saint-François de Montmorency-Laval, first Bishop of Quebec
Louis-Joseph de Montmorency-Laval, Bishop of Metz
Mathieu de Montmorency (1767–1826), statesman during the French Revolution and Bourbon Restoration

See also
Duke of Brittany
French nobility

References

Sources

External links
Anne d'Alegre (d. 1619) biography emphasizing her teeth.

 
Laval
Laval